Crealy Theme Park & Resort, formerly Crealy Adventure Park & Resort, is Southwest England's largest family theme park attraction with over 60 rides, attractions, live shows, animal attractions and Sooty Land.  Just outside Exeter in over 100 acres of countryside, it also has a large lodge, campsites and variety of entertainment and sport facilities.

History
The land for Crealy Theme Park & Resort was bought from King's College, Cambridge in 1982. Its first visitors arrived in 1988 when it was operating as a farm, coming to see the cows being milked using its state-of-the-art dairy unit. It officially opened in 1989 as a working farm, Crealy the Great Farm Adventure, the same year its restaurant and Treetops playground were opened.

In 1992, the name of the park changed to Crealy Country and more attractions were introduced, including quad bikes and the bumper boat lake.

In 1994, the cows were sold so that their barns could be used for undercover attractions. The next year, the Adventure Zone was opened.

In 1997, the Magical Kingdom (formerly Buddy Bear's Kingdom and now The Pier) was opened.

In 2000 the park's first rollercoaster was added – a Vekoma Junior Coaster called Maximus. Further rollercoasters were added in 2014 and 2015. Its 2015 addition, Twister Rollercoaster, a spinning wild mouse, is the largest ride in the park.

In 2011, following some refurbishments, Devon County Council granted owners Maximum Fun a licence to keep various exotic animals and operate Crealy as a zoo. The first animals to be exhibited were Meerkats. 

In 2012, the park opened accommodation nearby at Crealy Meadows Caravan and Camping Park. Now known as Crealy Meadows, the site offers camping and caravan pitches, themed tents, and luxury lodges and glamping.

In February 2019, Crealy abandoned zero-hour contracts for its staff in favour of permanent roles. The park speculated that it was one of the first theme parks in the country to do this.

In February 2022, the park announced the opening of a Sooty-themed area for the May Half Term. It features four rides, a themed store, other themed attractions and a live show. It opened on May 28, 2022.

Rides
Presently Crealy has over 60 rides, attractions and live shows. These include thrill rides, rollercoasters, water rides, and indoor and outdoor play areas. The Animal Barn houses zoo and farm animals.

Camel Creek Adventure Park
Terry Sandling bought Trelow Farm in Tredinnick and opened the property to the public in 1989 as The Shire Horse Centre. The property was then sold to Crealy Great Adventure Parks in 2004. Following an acquisition in 2015, John Broome CBE purchased Cornwall's Crealy and rebranded it as Camel Creek Adventure Park. The park attracts approximately 200,000 people a year.

Major rides include the new 5D Simulator, Morgawr, The Beast, Raging River and Thunder Falls. Camel Creek targets younger children up to the age of six. Swampy and Dina are resident characters.

References

External links

 www.crealy.co.uk

Amusement parks in England
Buildings and structures in Devon
Tourist attractions in Devon
1989 establishments in England
Amusement parks opened in 1989